Lasallia papulosa (common toadskin) is an umbilicate lichen (a lichen attached to its substrate at a single point). It is in the family Umbilicariaceae.

References

Lichens described in 1810
Umbilicariales
Lichen species
Taxa named by Erik Acharius